Thompson's Ghost is a 1966 TV movie. It was a pilot for a series.

Lorenzo Semple Jr co wrote it. It was a vehicle for Bert Lahr and was made by Bing Crosby's production company.

Plot
A ghost makes life difficult for a family.

Cast
Phyllis Coates as Milly Thompson
Pamela Dapo as Annabelle Thompson
Trudy Howard as Nurse
Barry Kelley as Chief Watson
Bert Lahr as Henry Thompson
Tim Matheson as Eddie Thompson
Robert Rockwell as Sam Thompson
Willard Waterman as Doctor Wheeler

References

External links

1966 television films
1966 films
American television films